AS Olympique de Messira is a Malian football club based in Bamako. They play in the Malien Première Division.

References

Football clubs in Mali